Austin Tam-George is an academic who served as the Rivers State Commissioner of Information and Communications from 21 December 2015 to 23 June 2017 when he voluntarily resigned from his post in Governor Wike's Cabinet. Before his appointment, Tam-George was the executive director of the Institute of Communication and Corporate Studies.

Education
Tam-George received his PhD from the University of the Witwatersrand, South Africa and attended the IESE Business School in Barcelona, where he studied communication and institutional leadership.

Career
As an academic, he taught at Pan-African University in Nigeria and at University of Cape Town where he was an Andrew W. Mellon Postdoctoral Research Fellow.

In 2008, he worked as research consultant to the New Partnership for Africa’s Development in its good governance monitoring projects across Africa.

Commissioner of Information and Communications
On 9 December 2015, the House of Assembly voted unanimously to confirm Tam-George as Governor Wike's choice to succeed Ibim Semenitari as the Commissioner of Information and Communications. On 18 December 2015, he was officially sworn into office.

See also
 List of people from Rivers State
 Information and Communications Technology

References

Living people
Commissioners of ministries of Rivers State
People from Okrika
First Wike Executive Council
University of the Witwatersrand alumni
University of Navarra alumni
Academic staff of the University of Cape Town
Nigerian expatriates in Spain
Year of birth missing (living people)